Dalton O'Neale Holder (born 6 March 1953) is a former West Indian cricket umpire. He stood in one ODI game in 1995.

See also
 List of One Day International cricket umpires

References

1953 births
Living people
West Indian One Day International cricket umpires